Respect (Respè) (Regwoupman Sitwayen Pou Espwa) is a political party in Haiti.

History
In the presidential elections of 7 February 2006, its candidate Charles Henri Baker won 8.24% of the popular vote, finishing third. Baker represented the party once again in the November 2010 presidential elections, finishing sixth with the 2.38% of popular vote.

Baker stood again as the party's standard-bearer in the 2015 presidential elections. For the 2015 parliamentary elections, the party presented 6 candidates for the Senate and 36 for the Chamber of Deputies.

References

External links
Official Respect (Haiti) party website

Political parties in Haiti